Solid Gold is the second album by the British post-punk band Gang of Four, released in 1981. Two of its tracks, "Outside the Trains Don't Run on Time" and "He'd Send in the Army", are re-recordings of songs previously released as a single in the UK.

The album was issued in an CD expanded version by the EMI Records and Infinite Zero Archive/American Recordings labels in 1995, which added the songs from Another Day/Another Dollar EP.

Pitchfork listed Solid Gold as 24th best album of the 1980s.

Track listing

On the original EMI (UK) pressing of the LP, "Why Theory?" is track 5 rather than track 3.

The EMI Records and Infinite Zero/American 1995 reissue includes songs from the Another Day/Another Dollar EP.

Personnel
Gang of Four
 Dave Allen – bass guitar, vocals
 Hugo Burnham – drums, vocals
 Andy Gill – guitar, vocals
 Jon King – vocals
Technical
Jimmy Douglass - engineer
Andy Gill, Jon King - design

Charts
Album

Single

References 

Gang of Four (band) albums
1981 albums
EMI Records albums
Warner Records albums
Albums produced by Andy Gill